Cinema16: British Short Films is a DVD featuring British short films directed by the likes of Ridley Scott, Christopher Nolan, and Mike Leigh, as well as less well known names. It is the first in a series of DVDs released by Cinema16.

Contents
The short films included are About a Girl, Boy and Bicycle, Dear Phone, Doodlebug, Eight, Gasman, Girl Chewing Gum, Home, Joyride, Inside Out, Je T'Aime John Wayne, The Sheep Thief, The Short & Curlies, Telling Lies, UK Images, and Who's My Favourite Girl?.

All films are accompanied by audio commentaries.

Reception
An Empire review said, "it's like having a complete film festival in the comfort of your own home." This quote is often cited by a sticker on the DVD's cover.

References

External links
Press articles about Cinema16: British Short Films

2007 direct-to-video films
2007 films
Short film compilations
British short films
2000s English-language films